Epsa  is the name of a Greek non-alcoholic beverage company based in the city of Volos. It was founded in 1924.

Initially based on lemonades, today it produces various beverages and natural juices. It is one of the most historical beverage companies of Greece.

Sources
EPSA bio
Soft drinks in Greece
Epsa
Official site

Greek brands
Drink companies of Greece
Companies based in Volos
Food and drink companies established in 1924
Greek companies established in 1924